Kellan Gordon (born 25 December 1997) is an English professional footballer who plays as a defender for Crawley Town.

Club career

Derby County
Formerly of Stoke City, Gordon signed his first professional deal in 2015 with Championship club Derby County. On 22 August 2017, Gordon made his debut for Derby during their EFL Cup tie against Grimsby Town, replacing Mason Bennett in the 75th minute in their 1–0 victory.

On 31 August 2017, Gordon joined League Two club Swindon Town on a season-long loan along with teammate Timi Elšnik. On 9 September 2017, Gordon replaced Keshi Anderson to make his Swindon debut during their 3–0 away victory over Luton Town. On 28 October 2017, Gordon scored his first professional goal during Swindon's 3–0 away victory over Port Vale, netting Town's third in the 85th minute. Gordon went on to score three more times in all competitions before returning to Derby in April after sustaining a dislocated shoulder.

On 28 August 2018, Gordon joined League Two Lincoln City on loan until January 2019.

Mansfield Town
On 25 July 2019, Gordon joined Mansfield Town on a two-year deal for an undisclosed fee. On 5 February 2021, Gordon signed a new two-and-a-half-year contract with the club.

Personal life
Gordon's younger brother Kaide Gordon is a professional footballer for Liverpool.

Career statistics

References

External links

1997 births
Living people
English footballers
Association football midfielders
Derby County F.C. players
Swindon Town F.C. players
Lincoln City F.C. players
Mansfield Town F.C. players
English Football League players